James Darcy (29 January 1875 – 3 October 1932) was an Australian rules footballer who played with Essendon in the Victorian Football League (VFL).

Family
James Darcy was born on 29 January 1875.

Football
Recruited from West Melbourne Juniors, and playing on the half-back flank, he was one of the 20 who played for Essendon in its first VFL match against Geelong, at Corio Oval, on 8 May 1897:  Jim Anderson, Edward "Son" Barry, Arthur Cleghorn, Tod Collins, Jim Darcy, Charlie Forbes, Johnny Graham, Joe Groves, George Hastings, Ted Kinnear, George Martin, Bob McCormick, Pat O'Loughlin, Gus Officer, Ned Officer, Bert Salkeld, George Stuckey, George Vautin, Norman Waugh, and Harry Wright.

Death
He died on 3 October 1932.

Notes

References
 
 Maplestone, M., Flying Higher: History of the Essendon Football Club 1872–1996, Essendon Football Club, (Melbourne), 1996.

External links 
 
 

1875 births
1932 deaths
Australian rules footballers from Victoria (Australia)
Essendon Football Club players